Kolbjørn Lyslo (born 1975) is a Norwegian musician from Tromsø, Norway, although he moved to Oslo in 1994. He produces house music under the name of Doc L Junior (short for Doctor Lyslo Junior). He is a former member of band Aedena Cycle, and he has released several 12" records under the UK label Music for Freaks. Kolbjørn has also released one single with Bjørn Torske under the name of Krater, and has released one single with the band Pizzy Yelliot.

Releases

As Doc L Junior
How Ya Doin' (2000)
Dubs You Crazy With Peace EP (2001)
Just an E (2003)
Footnotes 3 (2009)

As Koolbear
Live Your Life (1998)

As member of Aedena Cycle
Traveller's Dream EP (1994)

As member of Krater
Alpenmorgen (2002)

As member of Pizzy Yelliot
Could You Be Loved (2005)

Sources
http://www.discogs.com/artist/12911-Doc-L-Junior
http://www.discogs.com/artist/3955-Aedena-Cycle
http://www.discogs.com/Various-Deep-Sea-Drilling-Sounds-From-The-Norwegian-Underground/release/225732

Living people
Norwegian musicians
1975 births
Musicians from Tromsø